Haider is a German surname. It may be a habitation name for someone living on a heath, or a reference to a place-name with similar ultimate meaning. It is a variation of Heider.

Notable people with the surname include:

Andreas Haider-Maurer (born 1987), Austrian tennis player
Celina Haider (born 2000), German ice-hockey player
Eduard Haider, Austrian slalom canoeist
Engelbert Haider (1922–1999), Austrian alpine skier
Ernst Haider (1890–1988), German painter
Ilse Haider (born 1965), Austrian artist
Joe Haider (born 1936), German pianist and jazz educator
Jörg Haider (1950–2008), Austrian politician
Markus Haider, Austrian singer
Maximilian Haider (born 1950), Austrian physicist
Michael Lawrence Haider (1904–1986), American petroleum executive
Roman Haider (born 1967), Austrian politician
Sepp Haider (born 1953), Austrian rally driver

See also
Heider (surname)

References

                   

German-language surnames